The Clayton Public Schools Historic District is a  historic district consisting of four blocks in southeast Clayton, New Mexico, centered on 6th and Cedar Sts.  Also known as Clayton Public Schools-Campus No. 1, its oldest buildings were built in 1935.  It includes work designed by Willard C. Kruger and other New Mexico architects in Pueblo Revival style and built by the Works Progress Administration. It was listed on the National Register of Historic Places in 1996;  the listing included seven contributing buildings, four contributing structure and four other contributing sites.

Kruger, who served as "State Architect" of New Mexico for one year, also led the state's FERA group of architects.  In the project termed "perhaps the most remarkable concentration of WPA-funded school buildings", Kruger's group "designed an entire four-block junior and senior high school complex for the town of Clayton".  The project eventually included a high school, a junior high school, agricultural and manual arts buildings, a gymnasium/auditorium, a football stadium, and more facilities.  The project was embraced by Raymond Huff, schools superintendent, who also found ways to use Works Project Administration funding for related arts and services projects. For Union County, hard-hit by Dust Bowl storms, the project was important and provided work at one point or another for 6,000 out of the 10,000 population.

See also

National Register of Historic Places listings in Union County, New Mexico

References

External links

Buildings and structures completed in 1935
Buildings and structures in Union County, New Mexico
Historic districts on the National Register of Historic Places in New Mexico
National Register of Historic Places in Union County, New Mexico
Pueblo Revival architecture in New Mexico